Senator McKim may refer to:

Alexander McKim (1748–1832), Maryland State Senate
Isaac McKim (1775–1838), Maryland State Senate